Luis Abarca (born 28 June 1965) is a retired footballer from Chile, who played as a defender during his career.

International career
He obtained a total number of 3 caps for the Chile national football team in 1991.

Achievements
 
 1983 Copa República

References

1964 births
Living people
Association football defenders
Chilean footballers
Chile international footballers
Club Deportivo Universidad Católica footballers
Deportes Iquique footballers